New Hanover County Schools (NHCS) is a school district headquartered in Wilmington, North Carolina, United States. It operates public schools in New Hanover County. It is the 12th largest school district in North Carolina and is estimated to be the 311th largest in the United States.

Schools

High schools
 Eugene Ashley High School
 John T. Hoggard High School
 Isaac Bear Early College High School
 Emsley A. Laney High School
 New Hanover High School
 Mosley Performance Learning Center
 Wilmington Early College High School
 South Eastern Area Technical High School

Middle schools
 Holly Shelter Middle School
 Murray Middle School
 Myrtle Grove Middle School	
 MCS Noble Middle School
 Roland-Grise Middle School
 Trask Middle	School
 Williston Middle School
 Lake Forest Academy School
 Gregory Middle School

Elementary schools

 Masonboro School
 Alderman
 Anderson
 Bellamy
 Blair
 Bradley Creek
 Castle Hayne
Carolina Beach
 Codington
 College Park
 Eaton
 Forest Hills
 Freeman School of Engineering
 Gregory School of Science, Mathematics, and Technology
 Holly Tree
 Lake Forest Academy
 Mary C. Williams
 Murrayville
 Ogden
 Pine Valley Elementary School
 Porters Neck
 Snipes Academy of Arts and Design
 Sunset Park
 Winter Park
 Wrightsboro
 Wrightsville Beach

References

External links
 New Hanover County Schools

Wilmington, North Carolina
School districts in North Carolina
Education in New Hanover County, North Carolina